Skaife is an English surname, a variant of the surname Scaife. Notable people with the surname include:

Mark Skaife (born 1967), retired Australian motor racing driver
Sydney Skaife (1889–1976), South African entomologist and naturalist
Christopher Skaife (born 1965), Yeoman Warder and Ravenmaster, Tower of London

References

English-language surnames